Empolis Information Management GmbH is a content management and knowledge management software company with focus on "smart information management".

Products 
Empolis is a provider of Smart Information Management software. Smart Information Management represents creation, management, analysis and intelligent processing of all relevant information for a company, regardless of producer, source, format, application, user, location or device. Smart Information Management combines component content management with knowledge management.

Products include:
Content Management
Knowledge Management
Service Management

History 

Founded 1986 as eps (printing systems) Bertelsmann, a subsidiary of MohnDruck GmbH in Guetersloh, Germany. In 2000 the company was renamed to empolis as a result of a merger of four German software companies (eps, step, tecinno, schnittstelle). In April 2009 Empolis GmbH, Living-e and Attensity Corporation joined forces to become the Attensity Group.

As of May 2010, Living-e and Empolis are doing business under the name Attensity Europe GmbH. In June 2012, the former “Enterprise Solutions” division of Attensity Europe GmbH  spun off and became a legally independent company called “Empolis Information Management GmbH”.

References

External links
http://www.empolis.com

Software companies of Germany